AMIN Worldwide (Advertising and Marketing Independent Network) is a global alliance of independently owned advertising agencies that share insights, knowledge and resources. Its member agencies are located across Americas, Europe/Africa/Middle East, and the Pacific Rim.

History 
AMIN was formed in the US in 1932 as a way for full-service advertising agencies to share media and research resources. Now, with 50+ member agencies worldwide, in addition to the savings on shared resources, AMIN members are adapting to the ever-changing landscape of advertising through trusted member-to-member communication, the development of educational conferences, and international collaboration.

50+ Member Agencies, across 32 countries.  With 93 offices and over 4000+ professionals. 
AMIN Worldwide was named one of Fuel Lines' Top 14 Advertising Agency Networks.

References

 s.a.
http://markets.financialcontent.com/stocks/news/read?GUID=32430420

External links

AMIN Worldwide Web site
LinkedIn Company Page
LinkedIn Group
 Twitter
You Tube Channel
 FaceBook Company Page

Advertising organizations
Advertising agencies of the United States
Organizations established in 1932
Organizations based in Minnesota
1932 establishments in the United States